Henryk Jerzy Gruth (born 2 September 1957) is a former Polish professional ice hockey defenceman.

One of the best Polish players, Gruth played for GKS Katowice and GKS Tychy in Poland. He spent one season in Switzerland with the Zürcher SC, where he scored seven goals and nineteen assists.

International career
Gruth was member of the Poland men's national ice hockey team for the 1980 Olympics, 1984 Olympics, 1988 Olympics and 1992 Olympics, as well as for 17 World Championships. He holds the record for the most selection to the Polish squad, with 248, as well as the record for the most points (109).

He was inducted to the IIHF Hall of Fame in 2006.

Coaching career
Following his playing days, Gruth turned to coaching. In 1996-97, he was head coach of EHC Salzgitter of the 2. Bundesliga in Germany. He had a record of 5-17-2. He was head coach of the ZSC Lions when current head coach Christian Weber was downgraded to the role of assistant of Beat Lautenschlager with the GCK Lions of the NLB.

External links
 Gruth's profile on eurohockey.net

References

1957 births
Living people
GKS Tychy (ice hockey) players
Ice hockey players at the 1980 Winter Olympics
Ice hockey players at the 1984 Winter Olympics
Ice hockey players at the 1988 Winter Olympics
Ice hockey players at the 1992 Winter Olympics
IIHF Hall of Fame inductees
Sportspeople from Ruda Śląska
Polish ice hockey coaches
Polish ice hockey defencemen
Olympic ice hockey players of Poland
ZSC Lions players